China Daily News is a traditional Chinese-language newspaper published in Tainan, Taiwan. It was first established on 20 February 1946  by the Kuomintang and first published on 28 March 1946. The newspaper focuses on the Tainan area. In 1949 a Taipei edition was founded.

See also
 Daily News Botswana
 Media of Taiwan

References

1946 establishments in Taiwan
Newspapers established in 1946
Newspapers published in Taiwan
Chinese-language newspapers (Traditional Chinese)
Publications with year of establishment missing
Mass media in Tainan
Kuomintang